Lucinda Gibbs (born 2 January 1976) is a retired South African tennis player.

Gibbs won four doubles titles on the ITF Circuit during her career. On 3 April 1995, she reached her best singles ranking of world No. 816. On 7 August 1995, she peaked at No. 442 in the doubles rankings.

In 1995, she played for South Africa in the 1995 African Games in Harare, Zimbabwe where she won the bronze medal in women's doubles.

ITF finals

Doubles: 7 (4–3)

References

External links
 
 

1976 births
Living people
African Games bronze medalists for South Africa
African Games medalists in tennis
Competitors at the 1995 All-Africa Games
South African female tennis players
20th-century South African women